The women's doubles wheelchair tennis tournament at the 2020 Paralympic Games in Tokyo is held at the Ariake Tennis Park in Kōtō, Tokyo from 27 August to 4 September 2021.

Seeds

Draw

References 

Wheelchair tennis at the 2020 Summer Paralympics